Labi may refer to:

Emmanuel Gyimah Labi (born 1950), Ghanaian composer, conductor, and music professor
Labi, Sikkim, village in India
Labi Siffre (born 1945), British poet, songwriter, musician and singer
Labi language
Mukim Labi, mukim of Brunei

See also
Ahmad ibn Muhammad al-Tha'labi, 11th century Islamic scholar
It Must Be Love (Labi Siffre song)", song originally written and recorded in 1971 by Labi Siffre
Labi Siffre (album), the 1970 debut release by Labi Siffre
Labu dan Labi, 1962 Malaysian comedy film directed by and starring P. Ramlee
Nasib Si Labu Labi, 1962 Malaysian comedy film directed by and starring P. Ramlee
Louisiana Association of Business and Industry, an interest group established in 1976